Elections to Bromley Council in England were held on 7 May 1998.  The whole council was up for election and the Conservative party lost overall control of the council to no overall control.

Because the council fell into no overall control, for the first time in the London Borough of Bromley history it was taken over by a Liberal Democrat/Labour Coalition. This ended in 2001 when the Conservatives regained the council.

Election result

|}

Ward results
Incumbents in bold

References

1998
1998 London Borough council elections